Triumf may refer to:

 TRIUMF, Canada's national particle accelerator centre
 14959 TRIUMF, a minor planet
 S-400 Triumf, a Russian anti-aircraft weapon system developed in the 1990s
 Triumf Riza (1979–2007), Kosovo police officer and member of an elite protection unit
 CS Triumf Bârca, a Romanian professional football club

See also 
 Triumph (disambiguation)